Drumpf (alternately Drumpft) is a German surname that dates back to the 16th century. It is most commonly known as the likely predecessor to the family name of Donald Trump, businessman and 45th president of the United States. Talk show host and comedian John Oliver brought attention to the name during the "Donald Trump" segment of his television program Last Week Tonight.

History
Author Gwenda Blair researched the Trump family origins, and identified Hanns Drumpf, an itinerant lawyer, who moved to Kallstadt in 1608. The spelling of his last name had changed by the end of the 17th century. Another early Trump ancestor that can be identified as using this alternate spelling is Johann Philipp Drumpft (1667–1707, parents and place of birth not recorded), who married Juliana Maria Rodenroth.

In 2011, the International Business Times repeated an unverified claim that Donald Trump's paternal grandfather Frederick Trump changed his name from Drumpf to Trump, possibly to avoid anti-German sentiment popular at the time.

In 2019, German broadcaster DW Akademie reported from the Trump German ancestral home in Kallstadt that there were no more people with the surname, and that according to the city's transportation association, the spelling had likely been changed during the reign of Napoleon around the turn of the 19th century.

In popular culture
In the 2016 graphic novel Love Is Love, one comic features a superhero, Rainbow Boy, who uses his powers to fight "Doc Drumpf" and his armies of "Spider Haters".

References

Surnames
Surnames of German origin
Donald Trump